Emerson Hill is the name of a hilly area, and the neighborhood upon which the hill is situated in Staten Island, New York, one of the five boroughs of New York City, United States.

The roads on Emerson Hill are technically private, and several gates are found at approaches to the enclave. Since the gates are seldom closed and are not staffed by security personnel, it does not qualify as a gated community. Emerson Hill is separated from its equally exclusive neighborhoods of Grymes Hill just north of the Staten Island Expressway, and Todt Hill — where private roads also exist — borders on the south.

The hill is named for Judge William Emerson — oldest brother of Ralph Waldo Emerson — who lived with his wife, Susan, and children William, Haven and Charles in a long, brown shingle house known as The Snuggery. Willie and Haven were tutored in 1843 by Henry David Thoreau, who lived with the Emersons from May through October. It was the only time in his adult life that Thoreau lived anywhere but Concord, Massachusetts.

In 1971, two large mock Tudor homes at the end of Longfellow Avenue served as Casa Corleone for the filming of Francis Ford Coppola's classic movie The Godfather.

References

Neighborhoods in Staten Island